Lieutenant General Sir Denis John Charles Kirwan Bernard,  (22 October 1882 – 25 August 1956) was a British Army officer who commanded the 3rd Infantry Division shortly before the outbreak of World War II. He was also Governor of Bermuda and General Officer Commanding the Bermuda Garrison.

Early life and education
Bernard was born in London, the son of Percy Bernard MP. He was educated at Eton College and the Royal Military College, Sandhurst, and commissioned into the British Army as a second lieutenant in the Rifle Brigade (The Prince Consort's Own) on 22 October 1902.

Career

He fought in World War I as a River Transport Officer with the British Expeditionary Force and then served in France, Gallipoli, Salonika and Egypt. He was appointed Commanding Officer of the 1st Battalion, Royal Ulster Rifles in 1927, Brigadier-General of the General Staff at Northern Command in India in 1930 and Director of Recruiting and Organisation at the War Office in 1934. His last appointment was as General Officer Commanding 3rd Division in 1936 before he retired in 1939.

In retirement he became Governor of the Imperial fortress colony of Bermuda and General Officer Commanding-in-Chief of the Bermuda Garrison. While serving as Governor he had to consider proposals for American military bases there: these proposals were bitterly opposed by the local people at the time despite the war-time needs of the American military and he resigned at the request of the British Government in 1941 "to make way for a civilian". Bernard Park in Hamilton, Bermuda is named after him. His family home was Castle Hacket House in Galway, where he died in 1956, aged 73.

References

External links
Generals of World War II

|-

1882 births
1956 deaths
British Army lieutenant generals
Royal Ulster Rifles officers
Knights Commander of the Order of the Bath
Companions of the Order of St Michael and St George
Companions of the Distinguished Service Order
Rifle Brigade officers
British Army personnel of World War I
Governors of Bermuda
Bermuda in World War II
British Army generals of World War II
Military personnel from London